Muskoka was an electoral riding in Ontario, Canada. It existed in various incarnations and names throughout its existence. It started as Muskoka-Parry Sound in 1875 and then changed to Muskoka in 1886. In 1934 it changed to Muskoka-Ontario and lasted until 1955 when it changed back to Muskoka. In 1987 it changed again to Muskoka-Georgian Bay. It was eliminated by redistribution in 1999, and its territories went to the new ridings of Parry Sound—Muskoka (66%) and Simcoe North (34%).

Members of Provincial Parliament

References

 

Former provincial electoral districts of Ontario